The Taymani are an Aimaq people in Ghor Province in central Afghanistan. They speak the Aimaq dialect of Persian, but some southern groups of Taymanis speak the Pashto language and feel an affinity with the Pashtuns, although their Pashtun neighbors identify them as Aimaq.

References

Aymaq
Hazara tribes
Ethnic groups in Ghor Province
Modern nomads